Andrew S. Levey (born September 16, 1950) is an American nephrologist who transformed chronic kidney disease (CKD) clinical practice, research, and public health by developing equations to estimate glomerular filtration rate (GFR) (renal function), and leading the global standardization of CKD definition and staging.

Education and career
Levey graduated from the University of Chicago in 1972 with a Bachelor of Arts in Biological Sciences and graduated as a Doctor of Medicine (MD) in 1976 at the Boston University School of Medicine.He became a Professor of Medicine in the Tufts University School of Medicine in 1994, and was Chief of the Division of Nephrology from 1999 to 2017.

Contributions
Levey is known for developing the most widely used equations to estimate GFR (renal function) globally. He pioneered work with the MDRD Study Equation,  led the Chronic Kidney Disease Epidemiology Collaboration (CKD-EPI), which pooled measured kidney function CKD data from studies all over the world to develop equations to estimate kidney function from serum creatinine, cystatin C, and panels of metabolites and low molecular weight proteins. The 2009 creatinine equation with race and the 2021 creatinine equation without race to replace the 2009 equation are shown below:

For both equations, α  is -0.241 for females and -0.302 for males; min indicates minimum of Scr/k or 1, and max indicates maximum of Scr/k or 1 

Levey is an authority on clinical practice guidelines in kidney disease. He chaired the U.S. National Kidney Foundation Kidney Disease Outcome Quality Initiative (KDOQI) Clinical Practice Guideline Workgroup on “Chronic Kidney Disease: Evaluation, Classification and Risk Stratification”. The recommendations from this workgroup transformed the way Kidney Disease was defined and staged globally. The guideline has been cited over 10,000 times in subsequent research publications. He led multiple KDOQI and Kidney Disease Improving Global Outcomes (KDIGO) guidelines which advanced the global recognition and care for CKD, hypertension, acute kidney injury, living kidney donor evaluation, and nomenclature.

He was a founding member of the Chronic Kidney Disease Prognosis Consortium (CKDPC), which includes over 80 cohorts and 10 million participants and has informed multiple clinical practice guidelines and regulatory policies.

He led the U.S. National Kidney Foundation task force on cardiovascular disease in chronic kidney disease, which led to the recognition by the American Heart Association of CKD as a risk factor for cardiovascular disease.

He co-chaired the U.S. Centers for Disease Control and Prevention expert panel to develop comprehensive public health strategies for preventing the development, progression, and complications of CKD.

He led scientific workshops sponsored by the U.S. National Kidney Foundation in collaboration with the U.S. Food and Drug Administration and European Medicines Association for the evaluation of Renal function as surrogate endpoints for clinical trials of kidney disease progression.

He was editor-in-chief for American Journal of Kidney Diseases, the official journal of the U.S. National Kidney Foundation, from 2007-2016.

Awards
Tufts University School of Medicine: Dean’s Award for Excellence in Teaching (1986), Dr. Gerald J. and Dorothy R. Friedman Professor of Medicine (1999), Distinguished Faculty Award (2004), Dr. Gerald J. and Dorothy R. Friedman Professor of Medicine Emeritus (2017), Zucker Family Prize for Research (2019)
Tufts University: Faculty Recognition Award (1999)
Boston University School of Medicine: Distinguished Alumnus (2013)
National Kidney Foundation: President's Award (1998), Garabed Eknoyan Award (2002) and David M. Hume Award (2012)
American Society of Nephrology: Belding H. Scribner Award (2013)
Association of American Physicians: Member (2016)
European Renal Association/European Dialysis and Transplant Association: Honorary Membership (2020)
Web of Science High Cited Researcher Thomson Reuters and Clarivate Analytics (2014-2021)

Personal
Levey is married to Roberta Falke, MD. In 2009 he donated a kidney to her via a 3-pair transplant.

References

External links

American nephrologists
American scientists
American epidemiologists
University of Chicago alumni
Boston University alumni
Tufts University faculty
1950 births
Living people